French Pass (officially Te Aumiti / French Pass) is a strait that separates D'Urville Island from the South Island of New Zealand.

French Pass may also refer to:

 French Pass (Colorado), a mountain pass on the Continental Divide of the Americas
 French Pass (Oregon), a mountain pass in Morrow County, Oregon, United States
 French Pass (Waikato), a small settlement near Cambridge in New Zealand

See also
 French Passage, a passage through the Wilhelm Archipelago, Antarctica